Raritan Township may refer to:

Raritan Township, Henderson County, Illinois
Raritan Township, New Jersey
Edison Township, New Jersey, originally incorporated as Raritan Township
Raritan Township, Barnes County, North Dakota
Raritan Township, Day County, South Dakota, in Day County, South Dakota

Township name disambiguation pages